Financial services in South Korea refers to the services provided in ROK by the finance industry:  banks, investment banks, insurance companies, credit card companies, consumer finance companies, government sponsored enterprises, and stock brokerages.

Foreign banks
Foreign banks (Citibank, HSBC, Deutsche Bank, etc.) which have a presence in ROK are not international branches, but rather wholly Korean entities, due to Korean law.

International ATMs
Korean citizens may apply for an international ATM card corresponding to an interbank network such as Cirrus or PLUS, but foreign residents may not. Foreign residents in ROK, however, may use such interbank networks at ATMs in ROK through ATM cards procured in foreign countries.

Interbank ATMs are common throughout the country, especially in densely populated urban areas such as Seoul.

See also
List of banks in South Korea
Economy of South Korea

 
Finance in South Korea
South Korea